Sus or SUS may refer to:

Places
Sus, Lachin, a village
Sus, Pune, India, a neighborhood
Sus, Pyrénées-Atlantiques, France, a commune
Susch, Graubünden, Switzerland, a municipality formerly called Süs

People 
 Martin Sus (footballer, born 1989), Czech footballer
 Martin Sus (footballer, born 1990), Czech footballer
 Stepan Sus (born 1981), Ukrainian Greek Catholic bishop
 Sus (rapper), British rapper

Education 
 Shanghai University of Sport, China
 State University System of Florida, United States

Health 
 Sistema Único de Saúde, Brazil's publicly funded health care system
 Stavanger University Hospital in Norway

Science and technology 
 Sus (genus), the genus containing pigs
 Saybolt universal second, a unit of viscosity
 Single UNIX Specification, a group of computer standards
 Software Update Services, a software updating tool from Microsoft
 Stochastic universal sampling
 System usability scale, in systems engineering

Sport 
 Club SuS 1896 Bremen, a defunct German association football club
 Scottish Universities Sport, a professional body for university sport

Other uses
 Sus (film), a 2010 British film
 Sus (meme), an internet meme related to the video game Among Us, meaning "suspect" or "suspicious"
 Spirit of St. Louis Airport in St. Louis, Missouri, United States
 Susu language of Guinea and Sierra Leone
 Suspended chord, in music
 Young Independents,  the youth wing of the Independence Party of Iceland

See also
Sus law, formerly allowing broad powers to the police in Britain to stop and search
Sus al-Aksa, a former town in what is now Morocco
Suspicion (emotion), a feeling of distrust or perceived guilt for someone or something
Suspense, a state of mental uncertainty or anxiety
Sous, a name for the southwestern part of Morocco from the 13th to 19th centuries
 Suss (disambiguation)
Sussy (disambiguation)
Sus scrofa domesticus (pig)